Madonna and Child is a 1500-1504 oil on panel painting by Cima da Conegliano, now in the Minneapolis Institute of Arts.

References

1500s paintings
Minneapolis
Paintings in the Minneapolis Institute of Art